Count Gottfried von Bismarck-Schönhausen (9 March 1901 – 14 September 1949) was a German politician and German Resistance figure.

Biography 
Born in Berlin, Bismarck was a grandson of the 19th century Chancellor Otto von Bismarck. He was a member of the Nazi Party and in 1933 he was elected to the Reichstag as a Nazi member. In 1935 he became chairman of the regional council (Regierungspräsident) for Stettin, and later also for Potsdam. In 1937 he married a cousin, Countess Melanie Hoyos, in Vienna.

From 1942, however, Bismarck had been opposed to the continuation of World War II, and had made contact with other members of the German aristocracy who were working against the Nazi regime – such as the Berlin police chief Wolf-Heinrich Graf von Helldorf, Colonel Claus Graf von Stauffenberg, and General Friedrich Olbricht – with the aim of starting negotiations with the western Allies. He was aware of preparations for the 20 July plot to assassinate Adolf Hitler, but was not directly involved in it.

After the failure of the plot, Bismarck's connections to the plotters were discovered. He was expelled from the SS and from the Reichstag. Because of his famous name and many powerful connections, however, he escaped the fate of most of the active plotters. He was not arrested until August and he was not tortured. In October he was acquitted of the charges against him by the People's Court, but was nevertheless sent to Sachsenhausen concentration camp, where he was relatively well treated. He was liberated by Soviet forces in April 1945.

In September 1949 Bismarck and his wife were killed in a car accident in Verden an der Aller near Bremen, in the American Occupation Zone.

References 

1901 births
1949 deaths
Gottfried Graf von Bismarck-Schonhausen
Members of the 20 July plot
Nazi Party politicians
Counts of Germany
Politicians from Berlin
People from the Province of Brandenburg
Road incident deaths in Germany
SS-Brigadeführer
Sachsenhausen concentration camp survivors
Members of the Reichstag of Nazi Germany
Nobility in the Nazi Party
People acquitted of treason